Henry St. George Tucker III (April 5, 1853 – July 23, 1932) was a representative from the Commonwealth of Virginia to the United States House of Representatives, professor of law, and president of the American Bar Association.

Early and family life
He was born to Laura (née Powell) and John Randolph Tucker in Winchester, Virginia, and received a LL.B. from Washington and Lee University School of Law in 1876. He married Henrietta Preston Johnson in 1877, and had several children, among them John Randolph Tucker (professor). In 1898, he purchased the Col Alto estate at Lexington, Virginia.

Career
Tucker was elected to the 51st Congress as a Democrat and served four terms. He thereupon returned to Washington and Lee, where he became the professor of constitutional law and equity in 1897. Three years later he was made Dean of the Law School, in 1900.

He moved to Washington, D.C. and became dean of the school of law at Columbian University (now George Washington University) from 1903 to 1905, when he became President of the Jamestown Exposition.

Tucker returned to Congress in 1922, after a hiatus of nearly 25 years, when he was elected to the 67th Congress upon the death of Henry D. Flood in 1921. He was re-elected several times, serving until his own death in 1932.

Works

See also
 List of United States Congress members who died in office (1900–49)

References

External links

1853 births
1932 deaths
American people of English descent
Democratic Party members of the United States House of Representatives from Virginia
People from Lexington, Virginia
People from Winchester, Virginia
Presidents of the American Bar Association
Presidents of Washington and Lee University
Henry St. George Tucker 03
Virginia lawyers
Washington, D.C., Democrats
Washington and Lee University School of Law alumni
Washington and Lee University School of Law faculty